Naotkamegwanning First Nation, formerly known as Whitefish Bay First Nation and known in the Ojibwe language as Ne-adikamegwaning (Of the Whitefish Point), is an Ojibwe Nation from the Treaty Three Territory a 45min drive from Kenora, Ontario and is near Sioux Narrows, Ontario of Lake of the Woods.

Total registered population in September, 2010, was 1177, of which the on-reserve population was 713.  The First Nation is a member of the Bimose Tribal Council, a regional tribal council that is a member of the Grand Council of Treaty 3.

Governance
Naotkamegwanning First Nation is currently governed by Chief Howard Kabestra and 4 Councillors: Kirby Paul, Warren white, Ryan Tom and Linda Namaypoke. (2022 term)

Reserves

The First Nation have reserved for themselves four reserves:
 1954.3 ha Whitefish Bay 32A Indian Reserve, which serves as their main Reserve 
 1802.5 ha Yellow Girl Bay 32B Indian Reserve 
 518 ha Sabaskong Bay 32C Indian Reserve
 379 ha Agency 30 Indian Reserve, which is shared with 12 other First Nations.

External links
 Naotkamegwanning First Nation (DEAD) Website 
 AANDC Profile

First Nations governments in Ontario
Ojibwe